The Rockhurst Hawklets football team is one of the most successful high school football programs in Missouri. The team is composed of students from Rockhurst High School in Kansas City, Missouri and has made the most state championship appearances of any school in Missouri. Their main rivals are Blue Springs High School, Bishop Meige High School, Shawnee Mission East High School, and CBC.

Championships
Rockhurst is the only school to win a championship in each major state championship venue in the state of Missouri: Busch Stadium, Arrowhead Stadium, Faurot Field at the University of Missouri, and the Edward Jones Dome. The program also won a championship in a "non-championship" venue: its first championship, in 1971, at William Chrisman High School, against St. Louis Beaumont.

Its nine football championships is ranked fourth in Missouri history, behind Jefferson City, Valle Catholic, and Webb City high schools. The team has been to more state championships (14) than any other school. Five Rockhurst teams have won Missouri state championships with perfect records: 1971, 2000, 2002, 2007, and 2010.  The 2000, 2002, 2007, and 2010 teams finished the season nationally ranked 14th, 6th, 20th, and 19th respectively. All teams finished the season undefeated with records of 14-0, 13-0, 13-0, and 14-0 respectively.  The back-to-back state championship teams of 1986 and 1987 also finished nationally ranked, 14th and 13th respectively (after finishing 11-1 and 12-1).

Additionally, the last three head coaches of Rockhurst's football team, Al Davis, Jr., Jerry Culver, and Tony Severino, are all members of Missouri's High School Coaches Hall of Fame, and all won state championships with the Hawklets. Davis was a three-time recipient of the Knute Rockne Award, and Severino was named USA Today's National Coach of the Year in 2000.

State championship appearances

Player awards

The most outstanding high school football player in the greater Kansas City Metropolitan Area is awarded what was first christened the Dr. D.M. Nigro Award in 1931, and known since 1983 as the Thomas A. Simone Memorial Award.  The following are the Rockhurst players who have won this award:

 1939 – John Steck
 1942 – Len Lecluyse
 1947 – Bob Williams
 1952 – Alonzo Robinson
 1954 – Alex George, Jr.
 1971 – Chris Cummings
 1974 – Carl Tutorino
 1986 – Tim Ryan
 1987 – Kenyon Rasheed
 1998 – Sean Doyle
 1999 – Brandon Shelby
 2007 – Nathan Scheelhaase

Record

By coach
As of May 27, 2020

By opponent
As of September 4, 2022

References

High school football in Missouri
Sports in the Kansas City metropolitan area
American football teams in Missouri